Ian Frederick Filby (born 9 October 1954) is an English retired professional football forward who played professionally in England, South Africa and North America.

Career

Orient 
Filby began his career in the youth system at Second Division club Orient and signed his first professional contract on his 18th birthday in October 1972. He later won the London Challenge Cup with the reserve team in 1972 and 1973. He failed to make a first team appearance for the club before departing in 1975.

Montreal Olympique (loan) 
Filby moved to Canada to join North American Soccer League club Montreal Olympique on loan for the 1973 season. Manager Graham Adams commented that Filby was faster and had better ball control than the previous season's highly rated Scottish player Graeme Souness. Despite the build-up, Filby managed just three goals in Olympique's 19 regular season games.

Brentford (loan) 
Filby joined Fourth Division club Brentford on loan in September 1974 and made just three appearances during his spell.

Further loans 
Filby had loans at Scottish club St Mirren and Southern League Premier Division club Romford during the 1974–75 season.

South Africa 
Filby moved to South Africa in 1976 and played for National Football League and National Premier Soccer League clubs Durban City and Lusitano.

Sacramento Gold 
Filby returned to North America to sign for American Soccer League club Sacramento Gold in 1979. He had a good 1979 season, finishing the campaign as the league's top scorer (with 45 points) and winning the championship (after a 1–0 victory over Columbus Magic in the final) and being named on the league's All-Star team. Filby scored 11 goals in the 1980 season, before departing midway through the campaign.

Pennsylvania Stoners 
Filby signed for American Soccer League club Pennsylvania Stoners during the 1980 season and won his second successive championship, beating former club Sacramento Gold 2–1 in the final.

California Surf 
Filby returned to the North American Soccer League to sign for California Surf in 1981.

Later career 
After retiring from professional play, Filby remained in Northern California and continued to play in the amateur Central California Soccer League.

Honours 
Orient Reserves
 London Challenge Cup (2): 1971–72, 1972–73
Sacramento Gold
 American Soccer League (1): 1979
Pennsylvania Stoners
 American Soccer League (1): 1980

Individual

 American Soccer League All-Star (1): 1979

Personal life 
Filby's brother Malcolm was also a footballer and the pair played together at Sacramento Gold and California Surf.

Career statistics

References

1954 births
Living people
American Soccer League (1933–1983) players
English footballers
English expatriate footballers
Montreal Olympique players
North American Soccer League (1968–1984) players
California Surf players
Pennsylvania Stoners players
Sacramento Gold (1976–1980) players
Leyton Orient F.C. players
Brentford F.C. players
English Football League players
St Mirren F.C. players
Romford F.C. players
Southern Football League players
Durban City F.C. players
National Football League (South Africa) players
National Premier Soccer League players
English expatriate sportspeople in South Africa
Expatriate soccer players in South Africa
Footballers from Woodford, London
Expatriate soccer players in Canada
Expatriate soccer players in the United States
English expatriate sportspeople in Canada
English expatriate sportspeople in the United States
Association football forwards
Lusitano F.C. (South Africa) players